The axilla (plural axillae or axillas, also armpit, underarm  or oxter) is the area on the human body directly under the shoulder joint. It includes the axillary space, an anatomical space within the shoulder girdle between the arm and the thoracic cage, bounded superiorly by the imaginary plane between the superior borders of the first rib, clavicle and scapula (above which are considered part of the neck), medially by the serratus anterior muscle and thoracolumbar fascia, anteriorly by the pectoral muscles and posteriorly by the subscapularis, teres major and latissimus dorsi muscle.

The soft skin covering the lateral axilla contains many hair and sweat glands. In humans, the formation of body odor happens mostly in the axilla. These odorant substances have been suggested by some to serve as pheromones, which play a role related to mate selection, although this is a controversial topic within the scientific community. The underarms seem more important than the pubic area for emitting body odor, which may be related to human bipedalism.

Structure

Boundaries
Anatomically, the boundaries of the axilla are:

The lower posterior boundary is called the posterior axillary fold and this is a compound structure consisting of the latissimus dorsi and teres major muscles. It can descend after weight loss.

The anterior boundary is called the anterior axillary fold and this is rounded in shape and formed by the lower border of the pectoralis major. 
Some sources also include the pectoralis minor. It can elongate after weight loss.

The contents of the axilla include the axillary vein and artery, as well as the brachial plexus, lymph nodes and fat.
The axilla is the space between the side of the thorax and the upper arm.

Contents

 Axillary artery and its branches
 Axillary vein and its tributaries
 Infraclavicular part of the brachial plexus
 Long thoracic and intercostobrachial nerves
 Five groups of axillary lymph nodes and the associated lymphatics
 Axillary fat and areolar tissue in which the other contents are embedded

Society and culture
The term "underarm" typically refers to the outer surface of the axilla. However, the terms are sometimes used interchangeably in casual contexts. Colloquially, underarm  refers to the hollow beneath the junction of the arm and shoulder.

Tickling

The underarm is a ticklish area, possibly due to the number of nerves it contains. Most people find this area to be particularly unpleasant when tickled.

Underarm hair

Underarm hair usually grows in the underarms of both females and males, beginning in adolescence.

In some modern Western cultures, it is common for women to remove underarm hair. Some view this practice as an aesthetic matter, while others view its removal for health-related concerns. As underarm hair grows quickly, removal must be performed frequently, or stubble will appear in the axilla. 
In the feminist movement, the hippie culture, and in the punk rock scene, some women retain their underarm hair for a variety of reasons, from subversion to egalitarianism to comfort.
Conversely but uncommonly, some men choose to remove their underarm hair for aesthetic reasons or to reduce friction in sports such as swimming.

Clinical significance
Like other flexion surfaces of large joints (groin, popliteal fossa, cubital fossa and essentially the anterior part of the neck), it is an area where blood vessels and nerves pass relatively superficially, and with an increased amount of lymph nodes.

Lymphogenic spread of breast cancer
Breast cancer typically spreads via lymphatic vessels to the lymph nodes found in the axilla.

Axillary intertrigo
Excessive perspiration without adequate  air circulation can result in axillary intertrigo. Intertrigo is an inflammatory skin condition of skin folds exposed to friction or maceration in the presence of heat and moisture. Intertrigo is worsened by infection, usually fungal (Candida yeast species), but also bacterial or viral; warm, wet underarms promote those growths. The condition results in rash-like symptoms, pustules, or chronic itching or burning in the underarm.  Intertrigo (in any site) has no racial or sexual predilection.  Axillary intertrigo is common among those who work in hot environments where air circulation is restricted by necessary clothing or safety equipment.

See also
Deodorant
Perspiration
Popliteal fossa or "knee pit"
Suspensory ligament of axilla

Notes

External links

Step by step Video dissection of the Human Axilla showing all relevant anatomy
3D animated overview of axillary anatomy (rich media)

Upper limb anatomy